Scowcroft may refer to:

 Brent Scowcroft (1925–2020), former United States National Security Advisor 
 James Scowcroft (born 1975), United Kingdom footballer

See also
 Geoffrey Scowcroft Fletcher (1923–2004), British artist and art critic
 The Scowcroft Group, an international business advisory firm managed by Brent Scowcroft